Ángel Eugenio Orellana Hernández (born 2 March 1975) is a Salvadoran professional football manager. He is currently the manager of Second division club Rácing Jr.

Managerial career
He was in charge of Diriangén FC in Nicaragua First Division. sub campeón clausura 2012

sub campeon con Real madriz fc nicaragua segunda division apertura 2013

Manager Stats

Honours

Manager
Diriangén FC
Primera División de Nicaragua runner-up: 2012 Clausura

References

External links
 http://m.elgrafico.com/2012/02/21/dt-angel-orellana-dirigira-en-nicaragua/
 http://www.laprensagrafica.com/deportes/futbol-nacional/258817-orellana-en-las-semis-de-nicaragua
 http://www.elsalvador.com/mwedh/nota/nota_completa.asp?idCat=47863&idArt=6678082
 http://barracacique.com/13-directores-tecnicos-han-pasado-durante-la-sequia

1975 births
Living people
Salvadoran football managers
Salvadoran expatriate football managers
Diriangén F.C. managers
Expatriate football managers in Panama
Expatriate football managers in Nicaragua
Salvadoran expatriate sportspeople in Panama
Salvadoran expatriate sportspeople in Nicaragua